The Road Between is a 1917 American silent drama film directed by Joseph Levering and starring Marian Swayne, Bradley Barker and Armand Cortes.

Cast
 Marian Swayne as Polly Abbott
 Bradley Barker as Davey
 Armand Cortes as Al Dayton
 Gladys Fairbanks as Sarah Abbott
 Frank Andrews as Martin Abbott
 Kirke Brown as J. Foster Dobbs
 Sallie Tyscher as Flo

References

Bibliography
 Langman, Larry. American Film Cycles: The Silent Era. Greenwood Publishing, 1998.

External links
 

1917 films
1917 drama films
1910s English-language films
American silent feature films
Silent American drama films
American black-and-white films
Films directed by Joseph Levering
1910s American films